The following is a list of Royal Air Force Maintenance Units (MU).
The majority of MUs were previously Equipment Depots (ED), Storage Depots (SD) and Aircraft Storage Units (ASU)s.

No. 1 MU – No. 100 MU

No. 101 MU – No. 200 MU

No. 201 MU – No. 300 MU

No. 301 MU – No. 400 MU

No. 401 MU – No. 500 MU

No. 1 (India) MU – No. 10 (India) MU

See also 
List of Royal Air Force aircraft squadrons
List of RAF Regiment units
List of Fleet Air Arm aircraft squadrons
List of Army Air Corps aircraft units
List of Air Training Corps squadrons
List of Battle of Britain squadrons
University Air Squadron
Air Experience Flight
Volunteer Gliding Squadron
List of Royal Air Force units & establishments
List of Royal Air Force schools
List of Royal Air Force aircraft independent flights
List of RAF squadron codes
List of conversion units of the Royal Air Force
United Kingdom military aircraft serial numbers
United Kingdom aircraft test serials
British military aircraft designation systems
Royal Air Force roundels

References

Citations

Bibliography

Action Stations 

Lists of Commonwealth air force units
Maintenance Units
Maintenance Units